Yon may refer to:

 Yon (name), including a list of people with the name
 Yon (river), France
 Yon Mound and Village Site, a prehistoric archaeological site in Florida
 Yön ("Direction" in English), a Turkish weekly leftist political magazine published between 1961 and 1967
 YON, IATA code for Yongphulla Airport, Bhutan
 yon, ISO 639-3 code for the Yonggom language of West Papua and Papua New Guinea
 YON, the United States Navy hull classification symbol for "fuel oil barge (non-self propelled)"
 Pietro Yon, an Italian-born organist and composer who made his career in the United States